Jianyang is a district in the prefecture-level city of Nanping, in the northern part of Fujian province, People's Republic of China. Its population was 2,910,000 in 2013.

Jianyang has rich natural resources: bamboo, tea and water power.

History
From the 11th to the 17th century, commercial publishers established in the area used local bamboo for paper manufacturing and made the area one of the three largest book-producing areas in China in the Song (960–1279) and Yuan (1271–1368) dynasties. The area continued to be an important printing center into the Ming epoch (1368–1644).

Starting in the Southern Song (1127–1279), the county was served by the Chong'an trade route, which connected Quanzhou on the Fujian coast (the nation's major port for trade with Southeast Asia in those days) with northeastern Jiangxi province. This route allowed shipping of local products, notably books, to the major markets of the lower Yangtze region using mostly water transport, with just a few portages.

Jian ware was produced here during the Song dynasty. Master Xiong Zhonggui's Jiyufang Laolong kiln, located in a village near the town of Shuiji, has been able to restart production of Jian Zhan using original clay.

Administration

2 Subdistricts 
Tancheng

Tongyou

8 Towns 
Jiangkou

Xushi

Jukou

Masha

Huangkeng

Shuiji

Zhangdun

Xiaohu

3 Townships 
Chongluo

Shuifang

Huilong

Transportation

Expressway 
 G1514 Ningde-Shangrao Expressway
 G3 Beijing-Taipei Expressway

National Highway 
 G205

County-level Road 

 X809
 X817
 X819

Railway Station 
 Nanpingshi railway station (Literally: Nanping City railway station)

Specialty 
 Shuiji Bianrou

Famous people
Jianyang bore a famous teacher Fu Ping Hua, who is one of the most respected teachers of the city.

Chu Hsi was a philosopher of the Song Dynasty who taught in Kaoting College in Jianyang.

You Zuo is a scholar in the Chinese idiom "".

Song Ci is author of Collection of Grievance Relief Stories.

Image views

Climate

References

See also
Wuyi New Area

County-level divisions of Fujian
Nanping